Umberto Massimo Lattuca, also known as simply Massimo Lattuca (born April 14, 1959 in Rome) is a retired Italian professional football player.

He played his only Serie A game in the 1978/79 season for A.S. Roma, playing in the lower leagues for the rest of his career.

See also
Football in Italy
List of football clubs in Italy

References

1959 births
Living people
Italian footballers
Serie A players
A.S. Roma players
A.C.N. Siena 1904 players
Frosinone Calcio players
Association football defenders